Junk man is the (largely American) term for a person who buys, trades, or collects disparate items (scrap and usable/repairable things) considered of little or no value to their owners. This person then tries to sell or trade these items at a profit to other individuals and scrap yards.

Appearances in pop culture
The poet Carl Sandburg has a poem called "Junk Man," in which Death is personified by a junk man.
In his song "The Pretender", Jackson Browne imagines that "the junk man pounds his fender", alluded as a Los Angeles neighborhood sight.
In the television program Sanford and Son, the father's character, played by Redd Foxx, was a junkman, although even in those days the profession was not as common as it had once been.

See also
American Pickers
 Dumpster diving
Grubber
Karung guni
Mudlark
Rag-and-bone man, the British equivalent of this vocation
Sanford and Son, a television program centered on a junk man and his son
Tosher
Waste picker

References

Informal occupations
Waste collection